Canelo Álvarez vs. Dmitry Bivol, billed as Legacy is Earned, was a professional boxing match between 4-division world champion, Canelo Álvarez, and defending WBA (Super) light heavyweight champion, Dmitry Bivol. The fight took place on May 7, 2022, with Bivol prevailing as the winner by unanimous decision.

Background 
After Canelo Álvarez unified all four major world titles to become undisputed super middleweight champion with an eleventh-round technical knockout victory over Caleb Plant on November 6, 2021, it appeared likely that Álvarez would move up to challenge for a world title in a fifth division, when his trainer Eddy Reynoso successfully petitioned the WBC on November 15, 2021, to allow Álvarez to challenge WBC cruiserweight champion Ilunga Makabu. The fight ultimately did not happen, as Makabu was forced into a mandatory defense of his title in a rematch against Thabiso Mchunu on January 29, 2022, which the former won via split decision.

Instead, it was announced on February 25, 2022 that Álvarez had signed a two-fight deal with Matchroom Boxing; the first fight would see him returning to the light heavyweight division to challenge long-reigning undefeated WBA (Super) champion Dmitry Bivol on May 7 in a bout that would be televised as sports streaming service DAZN's first pay-per-view offering in the United States and Canada.

Bivol first won the WBA interim light heavyweight title in only his seventh professional bout in May 2016, making his first defense of the full WBA world title in 2017, before being designated as Super champion in 2019. Against Álvarez, Bivol made his fourth defense of the WBA (Super) title, and his ninth world title defense overall.

The fight was able to take place because while in response to the 2022 Russian invasion of Ukraine three of boxing's world governing bodies (the World Boxing Council, International Boxing Federation, and World Boxing Organization) had blocked championship fights involving Russian and Belarusian boxers, the World Boxing Association (WBA) chose to allow the fight to proceed.

Fight card

Broadcasting 
The bout was broadcast live by sports streaming service DAZN to existing subscribers worldwide excluding Latin America. The bout was broadcast on pay-per-view in the United States and Canada.

References 

Boxing matches
Bivol
2022 in boxing
May 2022 sports events in the United States
2022 in sports in Nevada
Boxing in Las Vegas
Events in Paradise, Nevada
DAZN